Brenda Jefferson Foster (1955 – May 17, 2010) was a witness for the prosecution in the 2008-2009 trials of her older siblings Betty Jefferson and Mose Jefferson, Betty Jefferson's daughter Angela Coleman, and Mose Jefferson's companion former City Councilwoman Renée Gill Pratt.

Brenda Jefferson Foster had originally been charged with some of the same offenses but accepted a plea bargain. In exchange for pleading guilty to a minor charge, she averted being prosecuted for the major offenses but agreed to serve as a witness for the office of U.S. Attorney Jim Letten. All the remaining defendants pleaded not guilty in U.S. Federal District Court for the Eastern District of Louisiana on 2009 June 5. At the 2009 June 5 arraignment U.S. Magistrate Joseph Wilkinson Jr. instructed the four defendants to refrain from contact with Brenda Jefferson Foster.

In a 2009 May 28 editorial the New Orleans Times-Picayune acknowledged Brenda Jefferson Foster's admission of her part in the alleged fraudulent activities.

At a hearing before U. S. District Judge Ivan L. R. Lemelle on 2009 June 17, lawyers for Betty Jefferson and Angela Coleman requested a delay from the 2009 August 3 start date for the racketeering trial; at the same hearing, however, lawyers for Renée Gill Pratt and Mose Jefferson requested that the racketeering trial begin as scheduled on August 3. On 2009 July 28, Lemelle delayed the start of the racketeering trial to 2010 January 25.

Notes

1955 births
Living people